Classical republicanism, also known as civic republicanism or civic humanism, is a form of republicanism developed in the Renaissance inspired by the governmental forms and writings of classical antiquity, especially such classical writers as Aristotle, Polybius, and Cicero. Classical republicanism is built around concepts such as civil society, civic virtue and mixed government.

Development
In the classical period itself the term republicanism did not exist, but the Latin term res publica, which translates literally as "the public thing" or "the public affair," was in usage. There were a number of theorists who wrote on political philosophy during that period such as Aristotle, Polybius, and Cicero, and their ideas became the essential core of classical republicanism. The ideology of republicanism blossomed during the Italian Renaissance, most notably in Florence, when a number of authors looked back to the classical period and used its examples to formulate ideas about ideal governance. One of the first to reintroduce classical republicanism was said to have been Niccolò Machiavelli (1469–1527) in his later reflections.

It has been argued that Machiavelli was not a classical republican, since he described mostly medieval political relations. Indeed, Machiavelli's innovation, addition, or transformation of classical republicanism more likely marks a turning point and the dawn of modern republicanism; Machiavelli's particular brand of republicanism has been dubbed "rapacious republicanism" by a collection of scholars. At any rate, that classical republicanism actually refers to a philosophy developed primarily in the early modern period is acknowledged by many scholars to be confusing; therefore, some now use the term early modern republicanism to cover this branch of political thought. To be sure, the conceptual, historical, and philosophical debate continues.

One variant of classical republicanism is known as "civic humanism", a term first employed by the German scholar of late medieval and early modern Italian history, Hans Baron. And although in certain cases and with certain scholars there is a subtle distinction between the two, they are for all intents and purposes interchangeable. Civic humanism is slightly wider in scope and stresses the central role of civic virtue in the preservation of the classically Roman/Florentine ideal of political liberty. Leading exponents of this dual concept are Hannah Arendt, J. G. A. Pocock, Quentin Skinner, and Philip Pettit.

However, Thomas Pangle (a student of Leo Strauss) has critiqued the inaccuracy of the "civic humanist" reconstruction, regarding it as a distortion of classical republicanism on the one hand and of Machiavelli's political science on the other hand. Pangle writes, "both Pocock and Arendt (the latter more self-consciously) obscure the imperialism, the ruthlessness, the warring hierarchy, and the glacial rationalism that truly characterize Machiavelli; over these elements they throw a veil of softened, egalitarian, 'civic humanism'."

According to Baron, for many years the foremost expert on the development of classical republicanism, the ideology was a product of the long conflict between Florence and Milan. Florence was ruled by its commercial elites while Milan was a monarchy controlled by its landed aristocracy. The Florentines asserted that their form of government was superior on the basis that it was more similar to that of the Greeks and the Roman Republic. Moreover, Leonardo Bruni (1370–1444) asserted, based on Tacitus's pronouncements in the introduction to the Histories, that republican government made better men, whereas monarchy was inimical to human virtue (see Tacitean studies). The Florentine ideal developed into the ideology of civic humanism, as per Baron.

Since Thomas Hobbes, at the core of republicanism is the concept of the social contract. Although modern republicanism rejected monarchy (whether hereditary or otherwise autocratic) in favour of rule by the people, classical republicanism treated monarchy as one form of government among others. Classical republicanism was rather aimed against any form of tyranny, whether monarchic, aristocratic, or democratic (tyranny of the majority). The notions of what constituted an ideal republic to classical republicans themselves depended on personal view. However, the most ideal republic featured form of mixed government and was based on the pursuit of civility.

Most controversial is the classical republican view of liberty and how, or if, this view differed from that later developed by liberalism. Previously, many scholars accepted the stance of Isaiah Berlin that republicanism was tilted more toward positive liberty rather than the negative liberty characterizing liberalism. In recent years this thesis has been challenged, and Philip Pettit argues that republican liberty is based upon "non-domination" while liberal freedom is based upon "non-interference." Another view is that liberalism views liberty as pre-social while classical republicans saw true liberty as a product of society. Because liberty was an important part of republican thought, many republican thinkers were appropriated by the theory of classical liberalism.

Classical republicanism became extremely popular in Classicism and during the Enlightenment, playing a central role in the thought of political philosophy since Hobbes, through John Locke, Giambattista Vico, Montesquieu, Rousseau, until Kant. Some historians have seen classical republican ideas influencing early American political thought.

See also
 Civic virtue
 Classical liberalism
 Classicism
 Communitarianism
 Libertarian conservatism
 Quarrel of the Ancients and the Moderns
 Political philosophy of Immanuel Kant
 Republicanism in the United States

People
 Adam Ferguson
 Andrew Fletcher
 James Harrington

Notes

References
 Brugger, Bill (1999). Republican Theory in Political Thought: Virtuous or Virtual?. Basingstoke: St. Martin's Press.
 Coutant, Arnaud (2007). Une Critique republicaine de la democratie liberale. Mare et Martin
 Fink, Zera (1962). The Classical Republicans: an Essay in the Recovery of a Pattern of Thought in Seventeenth-Century England. Evanston: Northwestern Univ. Press.
 
 
 
 
  Second edition, 2003, .
 Spitz, J-F, la liberte politique, Paris, PUF, leviathan

External links
 Cicero's influence on Classical Republicanism 
 Tocqueville and civic humanism 

Republicanism